Newburg is an unincorporated community in Friends Creek Township, Macon County, Illinois, United States.

References

Unincorporated communities in Macon County, Illinois
Unincorporated communities in Illinois